St Andrews Lutheran College is a private Lutheran based junior school, middle school, and senior school at Tallebudgera on the Gold Coast in Queensland, Australia.

History
Following the success of Trinity Lutheran College at Ashmore, Queensland, the Lutheran Church of Australia started to plan the establishment of a Lutheran school to service the southern end of the Gold Coast, Australia in the late 1980s.

The school is located in Tallebudgera, Queensland and currently has over 1200 students.

The school opened for teaching in February, 1993.

Since Opening, the school has expanded from one set of demountable classrooms, to ten extensive learning blocks. It facilitates three sporting ovals (as well as an indoor multi-purpose centre) and a basketball court. It has a theatre to support the performing arts a Covered Outdoor Learning Area (COLA) and in 2022 the Centre for Creative Industries was opened.

The school serves pre-school to 12th grade classes.

Extracurricular activities
In academic, sports, and the performing arts (PA), leadership positions include Leo (Lions Youth), Community Service Captains, House Captains, Student Council and College/Vice Captains.

The school encourages students to become active by holding three sporting carnivals, annually, for swimming, athletics and cross-country. The four school houses, Gowandi (green), Jubi (red), Binging (yellow) and Wardjam (blue) compete for house points to win the House Cup at the end of the year.

When the students reach their senior year, they become included in graduating traditions created by the students. These include the school formal (which is directed by a student-based formal committee), the Valedictory Dinner for students, parents and teachers, Presentation Night for awards, recognition and Performing Arts entertainment, and the Final Chapel which is led by the year twelve students with a Christian theme.

Principals
Wolf Stuetzel, 1993–1999
Ruth Butler, 2000–2009
Timothy Kotzur, 2010–2016
David Bliss, 2017–Present

Notable alumni

Sport

See also

 List of Lutheran schools in Australia

References

Private schools in Queensland
High schools in Queensland
Schools on the Gold Coast, Queensland
Educational institutions established in 1993
1993 establishments in Australia
Tallebudgera, Queensland